Stalker is a collaborative album by ambient musicians Robert Rich and B. Lustmord. It was inspired by the 1979 Soviet film of the same name, directed by Andrei Tarkovsky. The cover image is a photograph by landscape photographer Brad Cole. It is a work from 1988 titled Remnants of Resonance 2.

Track listing

References

External links
Hearts of Space Records Album Page
 

Robert Rich (musician) albums
Lustmord albums
1995 albums
Hearts of Space Records albums